Epigenesis may refer to:

 Epigenesis (biology), describes morphogenesis and development of an organism
 By analogy, a philosophical and theological concept, part of the concept of spiritual evolution
 Epigenesis (geology), mineral changes in rocks after formation.
 The Epigenesis, a 2010 album by Melechesh
 Epigenesis, a video game created during the 2013 Make Something Unreal competition

See also 
Epigenetics, changes in gene expression due to mechanisms other than changes in DNA sequence